Holmes Inspection is a 2009 Canadian home renovation series on HGTV, co-hosted by general contractor Mike Holmes and construction supervisor Damon Bennett. It is the third of Holmes' renovation series, following Holmes on Homes and Holmes in New Orleans. The format of the series is similar to those of his previous series Holmes on Homes, where Mike enters a home in need of repair and often finds substandard work.  However, unlike Holmes on Homes, whose focus was on substandard work done by fraudulent or poor-quality contractors, the focus of Holmes Inspection is on homeowners who have been victimized solely as a result of poor home inspections. While Holmes Inspection has been fairly popular, some within the home inspection community have criticized the show's presentation of their business. For example, Andrew Christie of Safe Homes Canada has critiqued Holmes Inspection as being more about comedy and exciting made-for-TV type scenes than about the actual work done by home inspectors.

In the United States, the series debuted on HGTV on Sunday, December 19, 2010.

Differences from Holmes on Homes
Changes from Holmes on Homes include decreased emphasis on Mike Holmes during the construction process, as crew supervisor Damon Bennett (who has held the title since season 6 of Holmes on Homes) takes control of most of the construction activity (deferring to Mike only on major decisions); Damon is also present in front of the camera for meetings with the homeowners (unlike Holmes on Homes, where only Mike appears).

There is also the use of 3D computer-generated imagery to illustrate problems and solutions.

Holmes Inspection is entirely shot in the Greater Toronto area, and only involves homes which were purchased within 18 months.  As the series is heavily focused on home inspections gone wrong, only homes with issues not accounted for in a home inspection report done with a home inspection service are considered.

Crew
Most of the crew from Holmes on Homes and Holmes in New Orleans return for Holmes Inspection.

Damon Bennett is the crew supervisor, having appeared since season 4 of Holmes on Homes, being elevated to the role of crew supervisor in season 6.  He is skilled in many trades, and comes from a long line of bricklayers.
Bill Bell, Mike Holmes's uncle, is the truck supervisor, in charge of tools. He has held this position since season 6 of Holmes on Homes.
Adam Belanger is the ex son-in-law of Mike Holmes, having married Mike's eldest daughter Amanda in between series (Amanda herself has been on the production crew since season 2 of Holmes on Homes), they have since divorced and Amanda has remarried.  He is an expert in operating heavy machinery, and is experienced in landscaping.  He has been with the Holmes crew since season 5 of Holmes on Homes.
Rob Brown is a member of the Holmes Inspection crew, debuting in the second season of the series.
Nichole Faucher is a member of the Holmes Inspection crew, debuting in the second season of the series.
Mike Holmes, Jr. ("M.J.") is the only son and youngest child of Mike Holmes, who, after graduating from high school in season 4 of Holmes on Homes (but having sporadically appeared in previous seasons), has joined his father's construction crew.
Sherry Holmes, Mike Holmes's daughter, joined the construction crew in New Orleans and has been a member for two and a half years.
Evan Jatou is a new member of the Holmes Inspection crew, debuting in the second season of the series.
Carl "Carlito" Pavlovic has been with the Holmes Crew since season 5 of Holmes on Homes.  He is known for his sense of humor and serves as the team's tile expert.

Former crew members 
Kate Campbell was a crew member for the first season of Holmes Inspection.  She has a lifelong passion for the trades, and acquired her training in Women in Skilled Trades, later joining Holmes on Homes as their second female crew member.  She is now part of the crew for another of HGTV's series, Decked Out.

Episodes
Note: All episodes seen in North America have been delayed a season and are shown out of order on this list.

Season 1

Season 2

See also
 Holmes on Homes

References

External links
The Official Holmes Inspection Site
The Holmes Inspection Site at HGTV Canada
 

HGTV (Canada) original programming
Television series by Corus Entertainment
2009 Canadian television series debuts
2011 Canadian television series endings
2000s Canadian reality television series
2010s Canadian reality television series
English-language television shows
The Holmes Group